Eight vessels of the British Royal Navy have been named HMS Terrible:

 , 26-gun sixth rate captured by the Spanish near Cape Saint Vincent
 , 14-gun bomb vessel
 , 74-gun third rate captured from the French
 , 74-gun third rate
 , 74-gun third rate
 , wooden-hulled paddle frigate
 , a  protected cruiser
 HMS Terrible (R93), aircraft carrier launched in 1944 and sold to Australia in 1947, where it was renamed 

Also
 Terrible was a gunboat that the garrison at Gibraltar launched in June 1782 during the Great Siege of Gibraltar. She was one of 12. Each was armed with an 18-pounder gun, and received a crew of 21 men drawn from Royal Navy vessels stationed at Gibraltar.  provided Revenges crew.

Citations and references
Citations

References

 Drinkwater, John (1905) A History of the Siege of Gibraltar, 1779-1783: With a Description and Account of that Garrison from the Earliest Times. (J. Murray).

Royal Navy ship names